Bryan Stanley Turner (born 1945) is a British and Australian sociologist. He was born in January 1945 in Birmingham, England. Turner has held university appointments in England, Scotland, Australia, Germany, Holland, Singapore and the United States. He was a Professor of Sociology at the University of Cambridge (1998–2005) and Research Team Leader for the Religion Cluster at the Asian Research Institute, National University of Singapore (2005–2008).

Turner is currently Professor of the Sociology of Religion at the Institute for Religion, Politics and Society at the Australian Catholic University. He is also faculty Associate of the Center for Cultural Sociology at Yale University, Research Associate, GEMASS at the Centre National de la Recherche Scientifique, Fellow of the Academy of the Social Sciences in Australia and Member of the American Sociological Research Association.

Early life
Turner attended Harborne Collegiate School for Boys and George Dixon Grammar School. He went on to the University of Leeds, where he completed a first class honours degree in Sociology in 1966. He received his Doctor of Philosophy at the University of Leeds in 1970 with a thesis titled "The Decline of Methodism: an analysis of religious commitment and organisation".  He has received several honorary degrees recognising his contributions to Sociology: Doctor of Letters at Flinders University in 1987, Master of Arts at the University of Cambridge in 2002 and Doctor of Letters at the University of Cambridge in 2009.

Career
Professor Turner's research interests include sociological theory, sociology of globalisation and religion, concentrating on such issues as religious conflict and the modern state, religious authority and electronic information, religious consumerism and youth cultures, human rights and religion, the human body, medical change, and religious cosmologies.

Turner wrote his first book Weber and Islam in 1974 and has since established an international reputation for his work on religion, Max Weber and comparative sociology. 

He is the founding editor of the journals: Body & Society (with Mike Featherstone), Citizenship Studies, and Journal of Classical Sociology (with John O'Neill). He is also an editorial member of numerous journals including: British Journal of Sociology, European Journal of Social Theory, Contemporary Islam and Journal of Human Rights.

He is the editor of two book series for Anthem Press: Key Issues in Modern Sociology and Tracts for Our Times; and also of Religion in Contemporary Asia for Routledge.

Professional recognition

Selected bibliography

References 

Alumni of the University of Cambridge
Alumni of the University of Leeds
Graduate Center, CUNY faculty
Fellows of Fitzwilliam College, Cambridge
Living people
Academics of the London School of Economics
British sociologists
Sociologists of religion
Medical sociologists
1945 births
Academic staff of Western Sydney University
Fellows of the Academy of the Social Sciences in Australia
Members of the Sociological Research Association